This is a list of candidates for the 1895 New South Wales colonial election. The election was held on 24 July 1895.

Retiring members

Protectionist
Patrick Hogan MLA (Raleigh)
John Wilkinson MLA (Albury)

Free Trade
Joseph Abbott MLA (Newtown-Camperdown)

Labor
John Kirkpatrick MLA (Gunnedah)
Michael Loughnane MLA (Grenfell)

Legislative Assembly
Sitting members are shown in bold text. Successful candidates are highlighted in the relevant colour. Where there is possible confusion, an asterisk (*) is also used.

See also
 Members of the New South Wales Legislative Assembly, 1895–1898

References
 

1895